Murray Downs is a locality in the Murray River Council, New South Wales, Australia. It is directly across the border from Swan Hill.

Heritage listings 
The Murray River road bridge over the Murray River connects Swan Hill Road in Murray Downs to Swan Hill in Victoria. The bridge is listed on the New South Wales State Heritage Register.

Recreation
The Murray Downs Golf and Country Club  has a 18 hole golf course and also a green for Lawn bowls.

References 

Towns in New South Wales
Towns in the Riverina
Murray River Council